This is a list of flag bearers who have represented Chinese Taipei at the Olympics.

Flag bearers carry the national flag of their country at the opening ceremony of the Olympic Games.

See also
Chinese Taipei at the Olympics

References

Taiwan at the Olympics
Chinese Taipei
Olympic flagbearers
Olympic flagbearers